Girls5eva is an American musical comedy television series created by Meredith Scardino that premiered on May 6, 2021 on Peacock. It follows four women who were part of a girl group named Girls5eva, which was briefly popular around the year 2000 before fading into one-hit-wonder status. Now unfulfilled in their various lives, they reunite to try to find musical success again. In June 2021, it was renewed for a second season which premiered on May 5, 2022.

In October 2022, after Peacock decided not to continue the series, it was announced that it would move to Netflix for its third season.

Premise 
A 1990s girl group that managed to score only one hit gets an unexpected chance at a comeback when their song is sampled by an up-and-coming rapper.

Cast

Main 

Sara Bareilles as Dawn, the self-proclaimed "chill one" of Girls5eva, who now works at her brother's Italian restaurant and has a son with her husband
Busy Philipps as Summer, the self-proclaimed "hot one" of Girls5eva, who is now married but mostly neglected by her husband, and lives in a mansion with her daughter Stevia
Paula Pell as Gloria, the self-proclaimed "always working one" of Girls5eva, a dentist who is divorced from her wife
Renée Elise Goldsberry as Wickie, the self-proclaimed "fierce one" of Girls5eva, who pretends to have a glamorous life but is scraping by as an airport employee

Recurring 

 Daniel Breaker as Scott, Dawn's husband and an exercise and menswear fanatic
 Jonathan Hadary as Larry Plumb, Girls5eva's sleazy former manager and founder of Plumb Management and Junk Removal
 Ashley Park as Ashley, the fifth member and the self-proclaimed "fun one" of Girls5eva, who was the glue of the band, having been a member of six previous girl groups. She died in an infinity pool accident in 2004 and was memorialized by a bench paid for by her bandmates.
 Erika Henningsen as young Gloria
 Andrew Rannells as Kev Hamlin, a former boy band member and Summer's long-distance husband who works in Tampa, Florida as an entertainment reporter
 Jeremiah Craft as Lil Stinker, a rapper who samples Girls5eva and brings them back to prominence
 Janine Brito as Caroline, Gloria's ex-wife
 Grey Henson as Tate (season 2), a young executive at Girls5eva's new record company, "Property Records"
 Piter Marek as Ray (season 2), a talented sound engineer/producer/songwriter who helps Girls5eva write their album
In addition, Julius Conceicao costars as Max, Dawn and Scott's son, a "New York Lonely Boy" (later taken over by Xander Fenyes), and Penelope Richmond as Stevia, Summer and Kev's daughter.

Guest 
 Dean Winters as Nick, Dawn's brother and an entrepreneur who owns ten businesses, one of which is an Italian restaurant where she works (season 1)
 Jimmy Fallon as himself (season 1)
 Stephen Colbert as Alf Musik, a songwriter (season 1)
 Tina Fey as Dolly Parton (season 1), who appears in Dawn's imagination to help inspire her to write songs again 
 Bowen Yang as Zander (season 1), a fan of Wickie's who manipulates her ego for his own personal benefit
 Vanessa Williams as Nance Trace (season 1), a famous manager whom Girls5eva approaches to manage them after they fire Larry
 Tim Meadows as himself (season 2)
 Amy Sedaris as Kris and Neil Flynn as Chris (season 2), Summer's parents who travel the country in a bus and visit Summer after she decides to get a divorce
 Mario Cantone as himself (season 2)

Episodes

Series overview

Season 1 (2021)

Season 2 (2022)

Production

Development
On January 16, 2020, Tina Fey announced at a Peacock investor presentation event that she was executive-producing an original series for the upcoming streaming service.

The series is executive-produced by Fey, Meredith Scardino, Robert Carlock, Jeff Richmond, David Miner and Eric Gurian. Production companies involved are Fey's Little Stranger, Carlock's Bevel Gears, 3 Arts Entertainment and Universal Television. In October 2020, it was announced that the pilot episode would be directed by Kat Coiro. On June 14, 2021, Peacock renewed the series for a second season. On October 27, 2022, it was announced that the series would move from Peacock to Netflix for its third season after being canceled on Peacock after the second season concluded.

Some filming took place at Kaufman Astoria Studios in Queens, New York, best known as the home of Sesame Street.

Casting
On August 10, 2020, Sara Bareilles was cast in a starring role. In October 2020, Renée Elise Goldsberry, Busy Philipps, and Paula Pell were stated to be joining the cast in starring roles alongside Bareilles. In the same month, Ashley Park joined the cast in a recurring role. On April 14, 2021, Daniel Breaker was announced to have cast in a recurring role. On March 13, 2022, Scardino revealed that Amy Sedaris and Neil Flynn joined the cast for the second season at the SXSW Studio in Austin, Texas. On April 6, 2022, additional guest stars were announced including Amber Ruffin, Chad L. Coleman, Grey Henson, Heidi Gardner, Hoda Kotb, James Monroe Iglehart, John Lutz, Judy Gold, Mario Cantone, Pat Battle, Piter Marek, Tim Meadows, and Property Brothers Drew Scott and Jonathan Scott, alongside returning guest stars Andrew Rannells, Park, Erika Henningsen, Janine Brito, Jeremiah Craft, Jonathan Hadary, Breaker, and Julius Conceicao.

Music
Most of the original songs for Girls5eva were composed by executive producer Jeff Richmond with lyrics by Meredith Scardino. The songs were inspired by music of the late 1990s. Bareilles also contributed to writing "4 Stars" and "I'm Afraid (Dawn's Song of Fears)"; she revealed that she was influenced by the music of Destiny's Child, NSYNC, and ABBA. A soundtrack album was released on May 6, 2021, through Epic Records. The soundtrack album of the second season was released on June 10, 2022.

Release

Marketing
On February 17, 2021, an official teaser for the series was released.

Broadcast
The series premiered on May 6, 2021 on Peacock. Selected episodes made their linear TV debut on E!. In Canada, it was set to debut on W Network on June 3, 2021. The second season premiered on May 5, 2022, with the first three episodes available immediately and the rest debuting weekly.

Seasons 1–2 were added to Netflix internationally on February 1, 2023.

Reception

Critical response
On Rotten Tomatoes, the first season holds an approval rating of 98% based on 46 critic reviews, with an average rating of 8/10. The website's critics consensus reads: "Smart, funny, and just nostalgic enough, Girls5Eva intelligent insights are brought to brilliant life by its talented quartet, whose individual gifts come together to make sweet comedic harmony."
On Metacritic, the first season has a score of 80 out of 100 based on 22 critics, indicating "generally favorable reviews".

The second season has a 95% approval rating on Rotten Tomatoes, based on 22 critic reviews, with an average rating of 7.6/10. The website's critics consensus states, "Like an addictive pop song, Girls5Eva is just as delightful the second time around, with its band of scrappy divas remaining one of the funniest ensembles on television." On Metacritic, the second season received a score of 81 out of 100 based on 10 critics, indicating "universal acclaim".

Awards and nominations

References

External links
 Girls5Eva on Peacock
 

2020s American LGBT-related comedy television series
2020s American musical comedy television series
2021 American television series debuts
Peacock (streaming service) original programming
English-language television shows
Television series by 3 Arts Entertainment
Television series by Universal Television
Television series set in 2021
Television shows filmed in New York City
Television shows set in New York City
Television series about fictional musicians
American LGBT-related sitcoms